KFMM (99.1 FM) is a radio station broadcasting a Classic rock format. Licensed to Thatcher, Arizona, United States, the station is owned by Cochise Broadcasting LLC.

It has been granted a U.S. Federal Communications Commission construction permit to reduce ERP to 6,400 watts and increase HAAT to 701 meters.

References

External links
 
 
 

FMM
Radio stations established in 1982
Mass media in Graham County, Arizona
Classic rock radio stations in the United States
1982 establishments in Arizona